Pierre Bourgeade (7 November 1927 – 12 March 2009) was a French man of letters, playwright, poet, writer, director, journalist, literary critic and photographer. A descendant of Jean Racine, he was also the brother-in-law of the writer Paule Constant.

Work

Prizes 
 1966: Prix Hermès-ESCP (Les Immortelles, Gallimard)
 1976: Prix du Syndicat de la Critique dramatique (Palazzo Mentale)
 1979: Prix Max Barthou de l'Académie française (Une ville grise, Gallimard)
 1983: Prix Mottart de l'Académie française + sélection Prix Goncourt (Les Serpents, Gallimard)
 1990: Prix du public et de la photographie Monte-Carlo (Quartier nègre)
 1998: Grand prix Paul-Féval de littérature populaire of the Société des Gens de Lettres (Pitbull, Gallimard)
 2009: Prix spécial du jury Sade (Éloge des fétichistes

Selected bibliography

Novels 
 1968: La Rose rose (Gallimard "Le Chemin")
 1969: New York Party (Gallimard "Le Chemin")
 1973: L'Aurore boréale (Gallimard "Le Chemin")
 1977: L'Armoire (Gallimard "Collection Blanche" - rééd. Folio #2446)
 1978: Une ville grise (Gallimard "Le Chemin")
 1979: Le Camp (Gallimard "Le Chemin")
 1981: Le Football, c'est la guerre poursuivie par d'autres moyens (Gallimard)
 1981: Le Lac d'Orta (P.Belfond)
 1983: Les Serpents (Gallimard "Le Chemin" - rééd. Folio #1704)
 1984: La Fin du monde (Denoël "L'Infini")
 1985: Mémoires de Judas (Gallimard "Le Chemin")
 1987: Sade, Sainte Thérèse (Gallimard "Blanche")
 1989: L'Empire des livres (Gallimard "Blanche" - rééd. Folio #2319)
 1993: La Nature du roman (Jean-Jacques Pauvert "Terrain vague")
 1998: Les Âmes juives (Tristram - rééd. Pocket #10669)
 1999: Warum (Tristram - rééd. Pocket #11025)
 2001: L'Éternel mirage (Tristram)
 2004: Les Comédiens (Tristram)
 2009: Le Diable (Tristram) Publication posthume
 2014: Venezia (Tristram) Publication posthume

Novel under the name Sabine de Surgis 
 1984: La Femme sans visage (Pygmalion Gérard Watelet)

Romans noirs 
 1986: La Rondelle (Mercure de France, coll. « Crime parfait »)
 1998: Pitbull (Gallimard, « Série noire » #2481)
 1999 : Téléphone rose (Gallimard, « Série noire » #2528)
 2001: En avant les singes ! (suivi de la nouvelle « Cette nuit-là », Gallimard, « Série noire » #2625)
 2001: Gab save the Di (Baleine, « Le Poulpe »)
 2004: Crashville (Flammarion)
 2006: Ramatuelle (Tristram)
 2008: Ça n'arrive qu'aux mourants (La Branche, « Suite noire » #26)

Collections of short stories 

 1966: Les Immortelles (Gallimard "Le Chemin" - rééd. Folio #1168)
 1995: Éros mécanique (Gallimard "L'Infini" - rééd. Folio #2989)
 1997: Cybersex et autres nouvelles (Ed. Blanche)
 1998: L'Argent (Gallimard "L'Infini")
 2000: L'Autre face, with Marie L. (Arléa)
 2003: Les Boxeurs (Tristram)
 2007: Rêves de femmes, ill. by Willem (Tristram)
Eros-Oser) -

Theatre 
 1968: Les Immortelles (Gallimard, series "Le Manteau d'Arlequin"). After the collection of short stories
 1973: Deutsches Requiem (Gallimard, "Le Manteau d'Arlequin")
 1975: Orden (Gallimard, "Le Manteau d'Arlequin")
 1977: Étoiles rouges ( Théâtre issue 604, 15 February 1977)
 1980: Le Procès de Charles Baudelaire followed by Palazzo Mentale and Fragments pour Guevara (Jacques-Marie Laffont)
 1989: Le Camp (Gallimard, "Le Manteau d'Arlequin"). After the novel
 1995: L'Autorisation (= Le Passeport) (L'Avant-scène Théâtre issue 968, 15 April 1995)
 1998: Erzébet Bathory (Variable)
 2002: Berlin 9 novembre (L'Avant-scène Théâtre « Collection des quatre-vents »)
 2004: Charenton. In Les Comédiens (Tristram)

Poetry 
 1979 : Hanthologie pour Henri Maccheroni (text on 32 photographs by Henri Maccheroni, Roger Borderie publisher)
 1984 : Ultimum moriens (dessins de Shirley Carcassonne, series "Deleatur", Dominique Bedou)
 1995 : Crânes (la Manière noire)
 2004 : Ô, plein de strideurs étranges (photos by Henri Maccheroni de 2000 photographies du sexe d'une femme, Abstème et Bobance)

Essays, conversations 
 1971: Violoncelle qui résiste (Le Terrain Vague)
 1972: Bonsoir, Man Ray (Belfond)
 1979: La France à l'abattoir (Ramsay)
 1988: L'Ordre des ténèbres (with Claude Alexandre - Éditions Denoël)
 1991: Chronique du français quotidien (Belfond)
 1997: le Mystère Molinier (Pierre Molinier et ses ami(e)s) (voice Richard Meier)
 1999: Brigitte Lahaie (with Claude Alexandre - La Musardine)
 2003: L'Objet humain (Gallimard "L'Infini")
 2003: Le Sang du Toro (with Claude Alexandre - Atlantica)
 2009: Éloge des fétichistes (Tristram) Posthumous publication

Photographs 
 2007: Rayographies', text by Jacques Henric, series "Erotica" issue 28 (Chez Higgins) - portfolio faisant suite à l'exposition à la Galerie Christian Arnoux

 Drawings 
 2002: Visite à Sade avec Man Ray et Visite à Pierre Molinier, livres de dessins à tirage limité, galerie Alain Oudin

 Filmography 
 1986: Léon Blum à l'échelle humaine, telefilm
 2005: Médor et Baudelaire by Gala Fur and Pierre Bourgeade

Prefaces, postfaces, collaborations 
 Une forêt de symboles : la poésie. Paris, L'Aventurine - les Éd. du Carrousel, 1999, 650 p. . Coll. "Une petite anthologie littéraire". Préf. p. 7-11.
 Alexandre, Claude. Toros. Portfolio. Chez Higgins, coll. "Témoignages", n°13, 2007.
 Alexandre, Claude. Corps sacré (textes et postface - with texs by Catherine Robbe-Grillet, Philippe Sollers, Isaure de Saint-Pierre, Michel Nuridsany, etc.). Ed. E-dite, 2009. 
 Autrand, Charles. One way : poèmes. Paris, Librairie Saint-Germain-des-Prés, 1970, 50 p. series "Poètes contemporains". Préf. p. 11-17.
 Blum, Léon. Le Dernier mois. Paris, Arléa, 2000, 95 p. . Préf. p. 5-9.
 Boisgel, Valérie. De l'aube à la nuit. Paris, Éd. Blanche, 2004, 139 p. series "Bibliothèque Blanche" #32. . Préf. p. 9-11.
 Boisgel, Valérie. Captive. Paris, Éd. Blanche, 2005, 138 p. series "Bibliothèque Blanche". . Préf. p. 9 [12]. Réed. J'ai lu, 2008, 93 p. . Préf. p. 7-[9].
 Dax-Boyer, Françoise & Lonsdale, Michael. L'Éden avant après. Paris, l'Amandier, 2008, 47 p. Coll. "Le Voir Dit". . Préf. p. 9.
 Debaille, Lucile. La Petite musique d'Éros. Paris, Ornicar, 2000. . Rééd. le Cercle, 2003, 151 p. Coll. "Le Cercle Poche" n° 36. . Préf. p. 7 8.
 Foucault, Annick. Françoise maîtresse : récit. Paris, Gallimard, 1994, 188 p. Coll. "Digraphe". . Préf. p. VII-[IX].
 France, Anatole. L'île des pingouins. Paris, Messidor, 1990, 380 p. Coll. "Les Grands romans de la liberté" n° 7. . Préf. p. 11–17.
 Fur, Gala. Séances. Paris, la Musardine, 2002, 140 p. . Préf. p. 7-[10]. Rééd. la Musardine, 2006, 157 p. . Coll. « Lectures amoureuses de Jean-Jacques Pauvert » n° 93. Préf. p. 7-[10].
 Gassel, Nathalie. Éros androgyne : journal d'une femme athlétique. Namur, Éd. de l'Acanthe, 2000, 104 p. Coll. "L'Instant". . Préf. p. [9] 11. Rééd. le Cercle, 2001, 92 p. Coll. "Le Cercle Poche" n° 20. . Préf. p. 5-8.
 Henric, Jacques & Amat, Jorge. Obsessions nocturnes. Paris, E-dite, 2006, 121 p. . Préf. p. 9-12.
 Holtrop, Medi. Plaisir. Rieux-Volvestre, Orbis Pictus Club, 2008, [152] p. . Préf. p. [3-9].
 Ionesco, Irina. Cent photos érotiques. Nyons, Éd. Roger Borderie, 1982, 110 p. Coll. "Images Obliques".
 Ionesco, Irina. Cent onze photographies érotiques. Nyons, Éd. Roger Borderie, 1981, 111 p. Coll. "Images Obliques" n° 6. 
 Ionesco, Irina. Le Divan, portfolio. Nyons, Éd. Roger Borderie, 1981, 8 p.-12 f. de pl. Préf. p. 3-7.
 Ionesco, Irina. Passions. Paris : Pink Star éd. ; Nyons : Le Club de livre secret, 1984, 78 p. . Préf. p. 4-5, 6–7.
 Klasen, Peter. Peter Klasen : oxidezing agent : tableaux objets choisis = chosen paintings objects : 1960 1990, catalogue d'exposition. Paris, Galerie Louis Carré & Cie -  Galerie Enrico Navarra, 1991, 96 p. Préf. p. 7.
 Kuniyoshi, Kaneko. Les Jeux, nouvelle illustrée par l'auteur, traduite du japonais par Pierre Bourgeade. Coéd. Shinchosha (Tokyo) et Galerie À l'Enseigne des Oudin (Paris), 1997, 100 p.
 L., Marie. Confessée. Castelnau le Lez, Climats, 1996, 157 p. Coll. "Arc en ciel". . Rééd. la Musardine, 2000, 158 p. Coll. "Lectures amoureuses de Jean Jacques Pauvert" n° 34. . Préf. p. 5-12.
 L., Marie. Noli me tangere : ne me touche pas. Paris, la Musardine, 2001, 87 p. Coll. "Carmina". 
 Le Sage, Patrick. Journal d'un maître. Paris, Flammarion, 2005, 279 p. Coll. "Grands conflits du XX° siècle". . Préf. p. 9-[19].
 Lévy-Kuentz, Stéphan. Sur le football. Paris, Méréal, 1998, 66 p. Coll. "Citoyenne". . Préf. p. 9-11.
 Lévy-Kuentz, Stéphan. Tu me fais mal avec ton coude. Monaco, Éd. du Rocher, 2006, 92 p. . Préf. p. 9-[10].
 Maccheroni, Henri. Un après midi chez Pierre Molinier. Bordeaux, Opales-Pleine page éditeurs, 2005, 45 p. Préf. p. 7-11.
 Marc, Alain. Écrire le cri. Orléans, l'Écarlate, 2000, 182 p. Préf. p. [VII]-XI. 
 Menchior, Rachel. Dessins érotiques de Menchior. Paris, Éd. Éric Losfeld, 1971, 150 p.
 Molinier, Pierre. Cent photographies érotiques. Nyons, Éd. Roger Borderie et Michel Camus, 1979, 112 p. Coll. "Images obliques" n° 4. Préf. p. 9-15.
 Rimbaud, Arthur. Les Vingt plus beaux poèmes. Paris, Librairie Gibert Joseph, 1991, 82 p. Coll. "La Substantifique moelle". . Préf. p. 7-8.
 Ray, Man. Bonsoir, Man Ray. Paris, Maeght, 2002, 131 p. Coll. "Chroniques anachroniques". . Préf. p. 7-11.
 Siméon, Jean-Pierre. Matière nuit. Bordeaux, le Castor Astral, 1997, 68 p. Coll. "Littératures". . Préf. p. [9]-11.

Publications en revues 
Poetry
 « Grand ciel de mots, Sade en automne », revue Digraphe, republié en ligne sur 

Narratives
 « Chimène chez Lipp », Les Lettres Françaises issue 58, April 2009 Read online

Articles
 Récit « Bourgeade rencontre Genet », revue Variable19 ; republié par et pour Les Lettres Françaises sur le site de L'Humanité
 Article sur la revue L'Humidité (dir. Jean-François Bory) and Michel Journiac, Les Lettres Françaises, June 2008 read on line
 « Joyce and Joyce », la Quinzaine littéraire, 15-31 janv. 1967.
 Chroniques « Bloc-notes », la Revue littéraire issues 1 to 7, Léo Scheer, avr. à oct. 2004 et issue 10, January 2005

On Pierre Bourgeade 
Articles biographiques
 « Pierre Bourgeade ». In 
 « Bourgeade (Pierre, Eugène, Henri) ». In Who's Who in France : dictionnaire biographique 2001-2002, 33rd éd. Levallois-Perret, Éd. Jacques Lafitte, October 2001, p. 333.  
 « Bourgeade (Pierre, Eugène, Henri) ». In 
 Balazard, Simone. « Bourgeade Pierre ». In Le Guide du théâtre français contemporain. Paris, Syros alternatives, décembre 1988, p. 141. Coll. "Les Guides culturels Syros". 
 Bourgeade, Pierre. « Bourgeade, Pierre ». In Garcin, Jérôme (dir.). Le Dictionnaire : littérature française contemporaine. Paris, Françoise Bourin, December 1988, p. 75-78. 
 Bourgeade, Pierre. « Bourgeade, Pierre ». In Garcin, Jérôme (dir.). Dictionnaire des écrivains contemporains de langue française par eux-mêmes. Paris, Mille et une nuits, March 2004, p. 64-66. Notice rédigée en 1988 et revue en 2003. 
 Cartano, Tony. « Pierre Bourgeade ». In Bonnefoy Claude, Cartano Tony, Oster Daniel (éd.). Dictionnaire de littérature française contemporaine. Paris, Éd. Jean-Pierre Delarge, September 1977, p. 72-73. 
 Confortès, Claude. « Pierre Bourgeade ». In Confortès, Claude. Répertoire du théâtre contemporain de langue française. Paris, F. Nathan, September 2002, p. 63. 
 Damour, Jean-Pierre. « Bourgeade, Pierre ». In Beaumarchais Jean-Pierre, Couty Daniel, Rey Alain (dir.). Dictionnaire des littératures de langue française, vol. 1 (A-L). Paris, Larousse, octobre 2001, p. 242-243. 
 David, Jean-Marie. « Bourgeade, Pierre ». In .
 Dumougin, Jacques. « Bourgeade, Pierre ». In Dumougin, Jacques (dir.). Dictionnaire de la littérature française et francophone, volume 1 (A-Eekhoud). Paris, Larousse, October 1987, p. 225. series "Références". 
 Dumougin, Jacques. « Bourgeade, Pierre ». In Dumougin, Jacques (dir.). Dictionnaire historique, thématique et technique des littératures française et étrangères, anciennes et modernes, vol. 1. Paris, Larousse, septembre 1985, p. 229. Réimpr. 12/1989. 
 Morelle, Paul. « Pierre Bourgeade ». Littérature de notre temps, recueil V. Paris, Casterman, 1974, p. 33-35
 Piatier, Jacqueline. « Bourgeade, Pierre ». In Beaumarchais Jean-Pierre, Couty Daniel, Rey Alain (dir.). Dictionnaire des littératures de langue française, tome A-D. Paris, Bordas, May 1988, p. 320-321. Rééd. : 03/1994, p. 319-320. . Reprise in L'Avant-scène Théâtre, 15 April 1995, issue 968, p. 29-30. 
 Poirier, Jacques. « Bourgeade Pierre ». In Grente Georges (dir.). Dictionnaire des lettres françaises, volume 6 : le XX, éd. réal. under the leadership of Martine Bercot and André Guyaux. Paris, Librairie Générale Française, May 1998, p. 175. Series "La Pochothèque. Encyclopédies aujourd'hui" #3109. 
 Schmitt, Michel P., « Bourgeade Pierre - (1927-2009)  », Encyclopædia Universalis [online], consulté le 20 août 2014.
 Tulard, Jean. « Bourgeade Pierre ». Dictionnaire du roman policier : 1841-2005. Paris, Librairie Arthème-Fayard, September 2005, p. 92. 

Magazine issues
 « Hommage à Pierre Bourgeade » (by Edmonde Charles-Roux, Franck Delorieux, Jean-Michel Devésa, François Eychard, Jean-Hubert Gailliot, Gabriel Matzneff, Jean Ristat, Jean-Pierre Siméon and François Weyergans), Les Lettres Françaises issue 58, April 2009 read online

Articles généraux
 Marc, Alain. « Le Corps caché de Pierre Bourgeade », revue de littératures Contre-Vox issue 7 « Odyssée Corps 2000 », January 2000, p. 72-75
 Ristat, Jean, « Mon ami, Pierre Bourgeade », Les Lettres Françaises issue 58, avril 2009 read online (see Numéro de revue)
 Streiff, Gérard. « Pierre Bourgeade : le Racine de l'érotisme ». Parutions Baleine janvier-février-mars 2001. Paris, Baleine, 2000, p. 25. 
 Weyergans, François, Les livres ne sont pas des cercueils, les Lettres françaises issue 58, April 2009 read online (see Numéro de revue)

Articles critiques
 Banse, Sébastien, que je voie qui est vivant et qui est mort. (sur le roman Le Diable), les Lettres françaises read online
 Ristat, Jean, « La Passion à Venise » (sur le roman Venezia), les Lettres françaises issue 118, September 2014 read online

Articles online
 Bourgeade, Pierre, « Pierre Bourgeade par lui-même », republished by le Nouvel observateur
 Jacob, Didier, « Pierre Bourgeade (1927-2009) », blog Rebuts de presse
 Gilles Heuré, L'armoire à tiroirs de Pierre Bourgeade, l'Humanité

References

External links 
    
 Parcours, pièces, adaptations théâtre et livrets de Pierre Bourgeade sur le répertoire de La Chartreuse
 
 
 Pierre Bourgeade on Wikiquote

People from Béarn
20th-century French male writers
20th-century French novelists
21st-century French novelists
French male short story writers
21st-century French short story writers
20th-century French dramatists and playwrights
French directors
French male screenwriters
20th-century French screenwriters
20th-century French poets
French literary critics
French photographers
French erotica writers
French crime fiction writers
1927 births
2009 deaths
Burials at Montparnasse Cemetery
21st-century French male writers
French male non-fiction writers